Cloverland may refer to places in the U.S, state of Wisconsin:

Cloverland, Douglas County, Wisconsin, a town
Cloverland, Vilas County, Wisconsin, a town
Cloverland (community), Wisconsin, an unincorporated community